Mario Montoya (born August 18, 1989 in San José, Costa Rica) is an Olympic and national record holding swimmer from Costa Rica. He represented native country at the:
2008 Olympics and 2012 Olympics,
2007 Pan American Games,
2007 World Championships, and
2006 Central American and Caribbean Games

As of July 2018, he holds the Costa Rican record in the 100 m, 200 m and 800 m freestyle and the 100 m backstroke in long course swimming and the 200 m freestyle short course.

References

Nowadays
Mario obtained a master's degree in Network Administration at Universidad del Turao in Puerto Rico. He currently works in Microsoft as a Support Engineer.

1989 births
Living people
Costa Rican male freestyle swimmers
Olympic swimmers of Costa Rica
Swimmers at the 2008 Summer Olympics
Swimmers at the 2012 Summer Olympics
Swimmers at the 2011 Pan American Games
Sportspeople from San José, Costa Rica
Pan American Games competitors for Costa Rica